Kalhöun is the ninth album by Christian alternative rock band Daniel Amos, released on BAI Records in 1991. It was issued under their contracted moniker dä and was their first album of studio material in four years.

Background

Following the release of 1987's Darn Floor-Big Bite, Daniel Amos took a hiatus of several years as band members worked on other projects, such as The Swirling Eddies.

Kalhöun was released during a special release party that was thrown for fans and held at Cornerstone '91 by Stunt Records. Lead singer and songwriter, Terry Taylor, was at the party to autograph CDs for the fans that attended. Stunt Records' Tom Gulotta held a special auction of D.A. memorabilia - including early artwork for Taylor's solo album, Knowledge & Innocence, a promotional copy of The Swirling Eddies video "I've Got An Idea" and Arthur Fhardy's flowery shirt, which was torn off him during a rowdy performance by the Eddies at Cornerstone '90.

"If You Want To," was later rerecorded by Taylor's other band, the Lost Dogs for their 2004 album MUTT.

Track listing
 "Big, Warm, Sweet Interior Glowing" (Words by Taylor, Music by Taylor/Flesch/Chandler)
 "If You Want To" (Words by Taylor, Music by Taylor/Flesch/Chandler)
 "Kalhoun" (Words by Taylor, Music by Taylor/Flesch/Chandler)
 "I Will Return" (Words by Taylor, Music by Taylor/Flesch/Chandler)
 "Tracking the Amorous Man" (Words by Taylor, Music by Taylor/Flesch/Chandler)
 "Virgin Falls" (Words by Taylor, Music by Taylor/Flesch/Chandler)
 "Gloryhound" (Words by Taylor, Music by Taylor/Flesch/Chandler)
 "Prayer Wheel" (Words by Taylor, Music by Taylor/Flesch/Chandler)
 "Note to Anna" (Words and Music by Taylor)
 "Father Explains" (Words by Taylor, Music by Taylor/Flesch/Chandler)
 "Gate of the World" (Words by Taylor, Music by Taylor/Flesch/Chandler)

Personnel
 Tim Chandler — bass guitar
 Greg Flesch — guitars, accordion, B-3 organ, and violin
 Ed McTaggart — drums and percussion
 Terry Scott Taylor — rhythm guitars and lead and backing vocals

Additional musicians
 Dave Hackbarth  trumpet
 Greg Kellog  pedal steel guitar
 Mikes Tackett  cello

Production
 Gene Eugene - engineer at Mixing Lab, Huntington Beach, California, mixing
 Additional recording at Neverland, Los Alamitos, California
 Terry Taylor - mixing Neverland Studios, art direction
 John Matousek - mastering at Soundworks West
 Court Patton - illustration, design and layout for Patton Brothers Design, El Cajon, California
 Court Patton - art direction
 Tom Gulotta - art direction
 Brian K. Tong - photography
 Ed McTaggart - film imaging for FMG Graphics, Newport Beach, California

References 

1991 albums
Daniel Amos albums